Halldór Ásgrímsson (pronounced ; 8 September 1947 – 18 May 2015) was an Icelandic politician, who served as prime minister of Iceland from 2004 to 2006 and was leader of the Progressive Party from 1994 to 2006.

Education and early life
Halldór studied at the Co-operative College in Bifröst, and became a certified public accountant in 1970. He later completed graduate commerce studies at the Universities of Bergen and Copenhagen, and worked as a lecturer at the University of Iceland from 1973 to 1975.

Political career
He represented the Eastern constituency as a member of the Althing (Icelandic Parliament) from 1974 to 1978 and from 1979 to 2003, when he was elected to represent the Reykjavík North constituency. Over the years, he has served in a large number of ministerial portfolios, namely as Minister of Fisheries from 1983 to 1991, Minister of Justice and Ecclesiastical Affairs from 1988 to 1989, Minister for Nordic Cooperation from 1985 to 1987 and 1995 to 1999 and Minister of Foreign Affairs from 1995 to 2004. As Minister of Foreign Affairs, Halldór put Iceland on the Coalition of the Willing, the alliance supporting the 2003 invasion of Iraq.

Halldór took over as Prime Minister on 15 September 2004, succeeding Independence Party leader Davíð Oddsson, while Davíð replaced Halldór as Foreign Minister.

On 5 June 2006, following poor results in municipal elections, Halldór announced his resignation as Prime Minister and stated that he intended to step down as leader of the Progressive Party in August 2006. Geir H. Haarde, the Foreign Minister of Iceland, succeeded him on 15 June 2006.

Halldór Ásgrímsson's successor as Progressive Party leader was Jón Sigurðsson, Ministry of Industry, Energy and Tourism, who was elected at the party's convention in August 2006. At the convention Halldór ended his political career with an emotional and dynamic farewell speech to the party. Halldór resigned as MP after the convention; he was the longest serving MP at the time.

On 31 October 2006, Halldór was chosen as the Secretary-General of the Nordic Council of Ministers.

Halldór Ásgrímsson was an Honorary Member of The International Raoul Wallenberg Foundation. He died of a heart attack at a Reykjavik hospital in May 2015.

References

External links

Halldór's biography (since his tenure as PM) 
Nordic Council of Ministers

|-

|-

|-

|-

|-

1947 births
2015 deaths
Accounting educators
Halldor Asgrimsson
Halldor Asgrimsson
Halldor Asgrimsson
Halldor Asgrimsson
Halldor Asgrimsson
Halldor Asgrimsson
Halldor Asgrimsson
Halldor Asgrimsson
University of Bergen alumni
University of Copenhagen alumni
Halldor Asgrimsson